The 2006 F3000 International Masters season was the second International Formula Master series season. The season consisted of sixteen races at seven rounds, beginning on 1 April at the Autodromo Nazionale Monza and finishing on 22 October at the Autódromo do Estoril. 11 teams and 30 drivers competed. In this one-make formula all drivers had to utilize Lola chassis and Zytek engines.

Teams and drivers

Race calendar

Championship Standings

Drivers

Points were awarded to the top eight classified finishers using the following structure:

Trofeo Momo

Teams

References

External links
Speedsport Magazine

Euroseries 3000
International Formula Master seasons
F3000 International Masters